Lynn Kramer is an American skateboarder and snowboarder.

One of the few women to compete and win head-to-head against men half her age, Lynn Kramer has been crowned 16 times as the world champion in slalom racing, and set the world's record in 2008 for 100 cones. She is one of the only women in skateboarding to have her own pro model. She has skateboarded since the 1980s, but started to compete in slalom in 2003 and has been winning ever since. She also teaches the sport of slalom racing to youth.

References

External links
Personal Website
YouTube video- Lynn Kramer Skateboard Racing Champ
YouTube video- Lynn Kramer Breaks 100 Cone Record

American skateboarders
Female skateboarders
Living people
American sportswomen
Year of birth missing (living people)
21st-century American women